Morocco World News (MWN) is an English language e-newspaper with its headquarters in Rabat and Washington, D.C. It publishes news about Morocco and MENA region on a wide range of topics, including politics, economics, international relations, lifestyle, technology, culture, sports, and Western Sahara.

MWN was founded in May 2011 by Samir and Adnane Bennis, two Moroccan brothers living at the time in New York City. In 2017, it relocated its US headquarters from New York City to Washington, DC. By 2019, MWN counted journalists and editors in Washington DC, New York City, Rabat, Essaouira, Fes, and the Netherlands.

Samir Bennis has served as its editor-in-chief, a political analyst and author since its inception. Adnane Bennis has been the managing editor.

Reception
Andrew R. Smith, Professor in the Department of Communication, Journalism and Media at Edinboro University described Morocco World News as a "makhzenian source".

See also 
 List of newspapers in Morocco
 List of magazines in Morocco

External links

References 

Newspapers published in Morocco
2011 establishments in Morocco
2011 establishments in New York City
Arab mass media
Propaganda in Morocco